The Two-state solution may refer to:

Two-state solution, Israel and Palestine
Two-state solution (Cyprus), Turkish and Greek
Two-state solution (Iraqi–Kurdish negotiations)
Dissolution of Czechoslovakia to Czech Republic and Slovakia in 1991
Partition of India in 1948

See also
Two-nation theory, separatism in colonial British India